Crumpton is a census-designated place in Queen Anne's County, Maryland, United States. Crumpton has a post office with the ZIP code 21628.

Crumpton changed from an unincorporated community to a census-designated place for the 2020 Census.

Per the 2020 Census, the population was 496.

Demographics

2020 census

Note: the US Census treats Hispanic/Latino as an ethnic category. This table excludes Latinos from the racial categories and assigns them to a separate category. Hispanics/Latinos can be of any race.

References

External links 

Map of Crumpton, from the Historical Society of Kent County collection

Census-designated places in Queen Anne's County, Maryland
Census-designated places in Maryland